Whiten v Pilot Insurance Co, 2002 SCC 18, [2002] 1 S.C.R. 595 is a leading Supreme Court of Canada decision on the availability of punitive damages in contract. The case related to the oppressive conduct of an insurance company in dealing with the policyholders' claim following a fire. According to the majority, "[t]his was an exceptional case that justified an exceptional remedy."

Reasons of the court
The Court's opinion was written by Binnie J.;  Justice LeBel dissented.

Binnie
The Supreme Court outlined the contractual duty of an insurer to deal with policyholders in good faith, the breach of which would make the insurer liable for punitive damages. Writing for the majority, Justice Binnie held that the defendant insurance company had breached its contractual duty through its high-handed and reprehensible treatment of the plaintiff insureds. Justice Binnie also restored the unprecedented $1 million jury award, which the a majority at the Ontario Court of Appeal had reduced to $100,000.

Justice Binnie accepted the standard for imposing punitive damages articulated in Hill v Church of Scientology of Toronto: "Punitive damages are awarded against a defendant in exceptional cases for 'malicious, oppressive and high-handed' misconduct that 'offends the court's sense of decency'..." Binnie set out the following principles to guide trial judges in their charges to juries:

LeBel
In dissent, Justice LeBel accepted the appropriateness of a punitive damage award but was critical of the award's magnitude and skeptical of the remedy's deterrence objective on the facts of the case: there was no evidence of endemic high-handed behaviour, either by the defendant insurer toward its policyholders, or in the Canadian insurance industry generally. In any event, he opined, regulatory and penal mechanisms would be more appropriate for any industry-wide concerns, than less predictable damage awards.

Justice LeBel agreed generally with the majority's description of principles governing punitive damages and, in particular, the importance of rationality and proportionality in shaping any such award. However, the original jury award in this case failed the rationality test because of its sole purpose of punishing the insurer's bad faith. It also failed the proportionality test because of the gulf between the quantum of the award and the loss suffered by the plaintiffs. The reduced award at the Court of Appeal, according to Lebel J., satisfied both of these tests, "impos[ing] significant punishment for the bad faith of Pilot without upsetting the proper balance between the compensatory and punitive functions of tort law." This award was sufficient and "consistent with the nature and purpose of punitive damages in the law of torts". The majority result, on the other hand, was inappropriate in the context of tort law:

Significance of the decision
Justice Binnie pointed to this decision among all of his Supreme Court opinions as giving him "particular satisfaction":

See also
 List of Supreme Court of Canada cases (McLachlin Court)

References

External links
 
 

Supreme Court of Canada cases
Canadian contract case law
2002 in Canadian case law